Damiano Quintieri (born 4 July 1990, Terranova da Sibari) is an Italian footballer, who currently plays as a midfielder for Argentina Arma in the Serie D.

Career
Quintieri began his youth career in Inter Logus Tarsia, a club from a town near his hometown, before moving to Inter's youth squad, in which he spent three years.  In the 2008-2009 season he debuted in Serie B with Pisa, while the following season, after Pisa went into Administration, he joined Montichiari in Serie D,  contributing with 23 appearances to the team's promotion to Lega Pro Seconda Divisione.

In the 2010-2011 season Quintieri played for Valle Grecanica in Serie D, before signing a three-year contract with Estonian club Kalju Nõmme, in the Meistriliiga, the top tier of Estonian football.  Kalju Nomme won the 2012 Meistriliiga, and Quintieri contributed scoring 9 goals in 24 appearances in the league; he also debuted in the Europa League qualifiers, playing both matches versus Khazar Lankaran.  The following season, he made his debut in the UEFA Champions League, scoring three goals in four appearances in the qualifying phase, including a brace in Kalju Nõmme's defeat against Viktoria Plzen.

Honours

Club

Montichiari 
 Serie D: 2009–2010

Kalju Nomme 
Meistriliiga: 2012

References

External links
 
 

Italian footballers
Nõmme Kalju FC players
Italian expatriate footballers
1990 births
Living people
Esiliiga players
Meistriliiga players
Expatriate footballers in Estonia
Association football midfielders
Italian expatriate sportspeople in Estonia